Poissy station (French: Gare de Poissy) is a rail station in Poissy, France, at the western edge of Paris.

Location 
The station is at kilometric point 25.835 of Paris–Le Havre railway.

History 
The station is inaugurated on 9 May 1843, then rebuilt in the 1870s. The building is dismantled in 1987 to make room for the current station. From 29 May 1989, the station is a terminus of one of the three western branches of RER A.

Service

Train service 
Poissy is served by RER A trains running on branch A5. It is its terminus. Service frequency is three trains an hour at off-peak time, six trains an hour during peak hours and two trains an hour at evenings. Journey time to La Défense is around 20 minutes, and around 30 minutes to Châtelet – Les Halles.

The station is also served by Transilien line J. Service frequency is two trains an hour at off-peak time and at evenings, and two or three trains an hour during peak hours. Journey time to Paris Saint-Lazare is around 20 minutes.

Connections 
The station is served by the following bus lines :
 Courriers de Seine-et-Oise lines 1, 2, 4, 6P, 7, 9, 10, 11, 14, 20, 24, 25, 50, 51, 52, 53, 54 and 98
 Hourtoule line 4
 Rive Droite bus network line 7
 Autocars Tourneux lines 3, 22 and 26
 Transport du Val de Seine line 3
 Établissement Transdev de Conflans line 5
 Établissement Transdev d'Ecquevilly lines 14 and 311
 Établissement Transdev de Montesson Les Rabaux lines 8 and 16
 Transbeauce line 88
 Noctilien line 151

See also
 List of stations of the Paris RER

References

External links

 

Réseau Express Régional stations
Poissy
Railway stations in Yvelines
Railway stations in France opened in 1843